Marcinków  is a village in the administrative district of Gmina Wąchock, within Starachowice County, Świętokrzyskie Voivodeship, in south-central Poland.

The village has a population of 674.

Marcinków was the location of several Paleolithic industrial sites, which are now archaeological sites, part of the Rydno Archaeological Reserve, consisting of several hundred former Paleolithic sites stretching from Skarżysko-Kamienna to Wąchock. The sites were discovered in 1921.

References

Villages in Starachowice County
Prehistoric sites in Poland